The Asia/Oceania Zone was one of the three zones of the regional Davis Cup competition in 2017.

In the Asia/Oceania Zone there were four different tiers, called groups, in which teams competed against each other to advance to the upper tier. Winners in Group I advanced to the World Group Play-offs, along with losing teams from the World Group first round. Teams who lost their respective ties competed in the relegation play-offs, with winning teams remaining in Group I, whereas teams who lost their play-offs were relegated to the Asia/Oceania Zone Group II in 2018.

Participating nations

Seeds: 
The first seed received a bye into the second round.
 
 

Remaining nations:

Draw

 relegated to Group II in 2018.
 and  advance to World Group Play-off.

First round

Chinese Taipei vs. China

South Korea vs. Uzbekistan

India vs. New Zealand

Second round

Kazakhstan vs. China

India vs. Uzbekistan

1st round relegation play-offs

New Zealand vs. South Korea

2nd round relegation play-offs

South Korea vs. Chinese Taipei

References

External links
Official Website

Asia/Oceania Zone Group I
Davis Cup Asia/Oceania Zone